Kathryn Gustafson (born 1951) is an American landscape architect. Her work includes the Gardens of the Imagination in Terrasson, France; a city square in Évry, France; and the Diana, Princess of Wales Memorial Fountain in Hyde Park, London. She has won awards and prizes including the Millennium Garden Design Competition. She is known for her ability to create sculptural forms, using earth, grass, stone and water.

Early life 
Gustafson was born and grew up in Yakima, Washington in 1951, her father was a heart surgeon. The basis of her designs comes from her memories of past settings. The region around Yakima is a desert-like plateau surrounded by mountains. At the age of 18, Gustafson attended the University of Washington in Seattle, where she studied applied arts for about a year. She then moved to New York City to attend the Fashion Institute of Technology. After graduating from the Fashion Institute, Gustafson moved to Paris to be a fashion designer. Gustafson turned to landscape design. She was educated at the Ecole Nationale Superieure du Paysage in Versailles, where she graduated in 1979.

Design work
Gustafson’s work is predominantly civic, institutional, and corporate, including parks, gardens and community spaces. Her award-winning projects include Westergasfabriek Culture Park in Amsterdam, Diana, Princess of Wales Memorial Fountain in London, Bay East and Gardens by the Bay in Singapore. Recent projects include Valencia Parque Central, the Novartis Campus in Basel and Marina One in Singapore.

She has become known for her creations of sculptural forms. Her work has been compared with the designs of landscape architect Isamu Noguchi.

Gustafson is slated to recreate the area around the Eiffel Tower for the Olympic games in 2024. The total cost of the overhaul would be 72€ million which would be funded by revenue.

Firms 
Gustafson Guthrie Nichol was established in Seattle and founded by Gustafson, Jennifer Guthrie, and Shannon Nichol.

Gustafson Porter + Bowman, founded by Gustafson and Neil Porter in 1997, is situated in London. The firm has international projects in the UK, Asia, Europe and the Middle East.

Notable works 
 Landscaping for Shell Petroleum Headquarters, 1992.
 Rights of Man Square, Évry, France, 1991.
 LeMay Museum
 L'Oreal Factory
 Corixa Headquarters
 Arthur Ross Terrace, American Museum of Natural History, 2000
 Lurie Garden, Chicago, 2004
 Diana Memorial Fountain, London, 2004
 University of Michigan: Museum of Art
 Washington Canal Park, Washington, D.C.
 Lakeshore Residence
 Esso Headquarters
 Garden of Forgiveness

Selected awards 
 Arnold W. Brunner Memorial Prize in Architecture (2012)
 American Society of Landscape Architects Design Medal (2008)
 Royal Designer for Industry U.K (RDI: 2005) (RDI: 2001)
 Remarkable Garden (2004)
 Chrysler Design Award (2001)
 Honorary Fellow RIBA (1999)
 Jane Drew Prize (1998)
National Design Award in Landscape Architecture, Cooper-Hewitt (2011)
EU Prize for Cultural Heritage in Conservation (2010)
International Architecture Award from the Chicago Athenaeum (2007 and 2009)
AIA/UK Excellence in Design Award (2008)
Medalist, French Academy of Architecture (1993)

Notes

References
 Diedrich, Lisa. "Kathryn Gustafson – Phantasie and Form." Topos journal. Issue 21, 1997.
Gustafson Guthrie Nichol Ltd.
Levy, Leah (1998). Kathryn Gustafson: Sculpting the Land. Spacemaker Press. Washington, DC.
Waldheim, Charles (2001). Constructed Ground: The Millennium Garden Design Competition. University of Illinois Press.
Gustafson Porter + Bowman.

External links

Gustafson Porter + Bowman
Kathryn Gustafson Awards
Gustafson Guthrie Nichol Projects
Kathryn Gustafson: Art of Landscape

1951 births
Living people
American landscape architects
Fashion Institute of Technology alumni
People from Yakima, Washington
University of Washington School of Art + Art History + Design alumni
American women architects
Women landscape architects